Group Captain Robert Lyle McKendrick Barbour,  (31 August 1895 – 1980) was a Scottish airman and a flying ace of the First World War credited with six aerial victories.

Biography
Barbour attended the Royal Military College, Sandhurst, as a Gentlemen Cadet, from where he was commissioned as a second lieutenant in the King's Own Scottish Borderers on 27 October 1916. On 22 December 1917 he was seconded to the Royal Flying Corps, receiving promotion to lieutenant on 27 April 1918. As a pilot with No. 205 Squadron RAF, he shot down six enemy aircraft between June and October 1918, the first three in a DH.4, and the latter three in a DH.9A. For his efforts, Barbour was awarded the Distinguished Flying Cross. The citation for the award read:

Barbour resigned his army commission on 1 August 1919 in order to accept a permanent commission in the Royal Air Force. He was promoted from flying officer to flight lieutenant in December 1925, and was awarded the Air Force Cross in June 1928. He received further promotions; to squadron leader on 1 October 1934, to wing commander on 31 December 1937, and to temporary group captain on 1 September 1940.

References

1895 births
1980 deaths
Royal Flying Corps officers
British World War I flying aces
Scottish flying aces
Royal Air Force personnel of World War I
Recipients of the Distinguished Flying Cross (United Kingdom)
Recipients of the Air Force Cross (United Kingdom)
Scottish military personnel
Graduates of the Royal Military College, Sandhurst
King's Own Scottish Borderers officers
British Army personnel of World War I